The Bread Man is a 1990 play by the Irish playwright Frank McGuinness.

Synopsis 
The Bread Man is set in Donegal in 1970. It follows a man, Sinner Courtney who is coming to terms with the death of his father who delivered bread.

Production History 
The play premiered at the Gate Theatre on October 2nd 1990. The production was directed by Andy Hinds and designed by Francis O'Connor.

In 2019 the Alingham Arts Festival commissioned a new production of the play directed by Keith Robinson.

Casting History

References 

1990 plays
Irish plays